James Griffiths (born 3 January 1977) is a Welsh international rugby union player who played club rugby for Swansea RFC. Griffiths has played over 125 games for Swansea, and made his only international appearance against Samoa in 2000. In 2003 he played regional rugby for the Scarlets.

Notes

External links
James Griffiths player profile at scrum.com
James Griffiths player stats ercrugby.com
Swansea RFC image

1977 births
Living people
Aberavon RFC players
People educated at Cwmtawe Community School
Rugby union locks
Rugby union players from Carmarthenshire
Scarlets players
Swansea RFC players
Wales international rugby union players
Welsh rugby union players